Sort of Revolution is the fourth album of original studio material from British musician Fink, also known as Fin Greenall. It was released on 25 May 2009, on the Ninja Tune independent record label.

Track listing

Personnel

Fink
 Fin Greenall – vocals, acoustic guitar, Vox (tracks 1, 3), electric guitar (4), percussion (5, 6), electric piano (6), synthesizer (6), keyboards (9)
 Guy Whittaker – bass (exc. 7), effects (9)
 Tim Thornton – drums (exc. 3, 7), effects (9)

Additional musicians
 Blair Mackichan – piano (1, 5, 6), Wurlitzer organ (6)
 John Legend – piano (2) 
 Ellie Wyatt – string arrangement (2)
 Son of Dave – harmonica (8)
 Andrea Triana – backing vocals (10)

Technical personnel
 Produced by Fin Greenall
 Recorded by Fin Greenall and Guy Whittaker at 7Dials Studios, Brighton, except
 the piano on "Move on Me" recorded by Anthony "Rocky" Gallo at The Cutting Room, New York City, and
 the acoustic percussion on "See It All" recorded by Kieron Menzies at Track Record, Los Angeles.
 Mixed by Fin Greenall at 7Dials Studios, Brighton
 Mastered by Kevin Metcalfe at The Soundmasters, London
 Artwork by Kate O'Connor
 Design by Panda Yoghurt

Chart performance

References

External links
Live video of "sort of revolution" at Intimepop.com

2009 albums
Fink (singer) albums
Ninja Tune albums